This is a list of the reptiles of Turkey.

There are 136 species of reptiles in Turkey.

Class: Reptilia

Order: Squamata (lizards and snakes)

Suborder: Amphisbaenia (worm lizards)
 Family: Blanidae
 Genus: Blanus
 Alexander's worm lizard (Blanus alexandri)
 Turkish worm lizard (Blanus aporus)
 Anatolian worm lizard (Blanus strauchi)

Suborder: Anguimorpha (legless lizards and monitors)
 Family: Anguidae
 Genus: Pseudopus
 Sheltopusik (Pseudopus apodus)
 Genus: Anguis
 Common slowworm (Anguis fragilis)
 Family: Varanidae
 Genus: Varanus
 Desert monitor (Varanus griseus)

Suborder: Iguania (agamas and chameleons)
 Family: Agamidae
 Genus: Paralaudakia
 Caucasian agama (Paralaudakia caucasia)
 Genus: Laudakia
 Laudakia stellio 
 Genus: Phrynocephalus
 Sunwatcher toad-headed agama (Phrynocephalus helioscopus)
 Persian toad-headed agama (Phrynocephalus persicus)
 Genus: Trapelus
 Horny-scaled agama (Trapelus lessonae)
 Family: Chamaeleonidae
 Genus: Chamaeleo
 Common chameleon (Chamaeleo chamaeleon)

Suborder: Lacertilia (true lizards)
 Family: Lacertidae
 Genus: Acanthodactylus
 Bosc's fringe-toed lizard (Acanthodactylus boskianus)
 Harran fringe-toed lizard (Acanthodactylus harranensis)
 Schreiber's fringe-fingered lizard (Acanthodactylus schreiberi)
 Genus: Anatololacerta
 Anatolian rock lizard (Anatololacerta anatolica)
 Danford's lizard (Anatololacerta danfordi)
 Genus: Apathya
 Anatolian lizard (Apathya cappadocica)
 Genus: Darevskia
 Armenian lizard (Darevskia armeniaca)
 Bendimahi lizard (Darevskia bendimahiensis)
 Brauner's lizard (Darevskia brauneri)
 Clark's lizard (Darevskia clarkorum)
 Derjugin's lizard (Darevskia derjugini)
 Charnali lizard (Darevskia dryada)
 Ajarian lizard (Darevskia mixta)
 Georgian lizard (Darevskia parvula)
 Meadow lizard (Darevskia praticola)
 Radde's lizard (Darevskia raddei)
 Spiny-tailed lizard (Darevskia rudis)
 Van lizard (Darevskia sapphirina)
 Saxicolous lizard (Darevskia saxicola)
 White-bellied lizard (Darevskia unisexualis)
 Uzzell's lizard (Darevskia uzzelli)
 Valentin's lizard (Darevskia valentini)
 Genus: Eremias
 Steppe-runner (Eremias arguta)
 Pleske's racerunner (Eremias pleskei)
 Strauch's racerunner (Eremias strauchi)
 Suphan racerunner (Eremias suphani)
 Genus: Lacerta
 Sand lizard (Lacerta agilis)
 Three-lined lizard (Lacerta media)
 Rock lizard (Lacerta oertzeni)
 Pamphylian green lizard (Lacerta pamphylica)
 Caspian green lizard (Lacerta strigata)
 Balkan green lizard (Lacerta trilineata)
 European green lizard (Lacerta viridis)
 Genus: Mesalina
 Blanford's short-nosed desert lizard (Mesalina brevirostris)
 Genus: Ophisops
 Snake-eyed lizard (Ophisops elegans)
 Genus: Parvilacerta
 Dwarf lizard (Parvilacerta parva)
 Genus: Phoenicolacerta
 Sparse blue lizard (Phoenicolacerta cyanisparsa)
 Lebanon lizard (Phoenicolacerta laevis)
 Genus: Podarcis
 Common wall lizard (Podarcis muralis)
 Italian wall lizard (Podarcis siculus)
 Balkan wall lizard (Podarcis tauricus)
 Genus: Timon
 Siirt lizard (Timon princeps)

Suborder: Scincomorpha (skinks)
 Family: Scincidae
 Genus: Ablepharus
 Twin-striped skink (Ablepharus bivittatus)
 Budak's snake-eyed skink (Ablepharus budaki)
 Chernov's skink (Ablepharus chernovi)
 European copper skink (Ablepharus kitaibelii)
 Genus: Chalcides
 Gongilo (Chalcides ocellatus)
 Genus: Eumeces
 Berber skink (Eumeces schneiderii)
 Genus: Ophiomorus
 Limbless skink (Ophiomorus punctatissimus)
 Genus: Heremites
 Golden grass mabuya (Heremites auratus)
 Genus: Trachylepis
 Bridled mabuya (Trachylepis vittata)

Suborder: Scleroglossa (geckos)
 Family: Gekkonidae
 Genus: Cyrtopodion
 Blanford's middle-toed gecko (Cyrtopodion heterocercum)
 Kotschy's middle-toed gecko (Cyrtopodion kotschyi)
 Rough-tailed gecko (Cyrtopodion scabrum)
 Genus: Eublepharis
 Iranian fat-tailed gecko (Eublepharis angramainyu)
 Genus: Hemidactylus
 Mediterranean house gecko (Hemidactylus turcicus)
 Genus: Stenodactylus
 Jordan short-fingered gecko (Stenodactylus grandiceps)
 Family: Phyllodactylidae
 Genus: Asaccus
 Werner's leaf-toed gecko (Asaccus elisae)

Suborder: Serpentes (snakes)
 Family: Typhlopidae
 Genus: Letheobia
 Beaked blindsnake (Letheobia episcopus)
 Genus: Typhlops
 European blindsnake (Typhlops vermicularis)
 Family: Leptotyphlopidae
 Genus: Myriopholis
 Long-nosed worm-snake (Leptotyphlops macrorhynchus)
 Family: Boidae
 Genus: Eryx
 Javelin sand boa (Eryx jaculus)
 Family: Colubridae
 Genus: Coronella
 Smooth snake (Coronella austriaca)
 Genus: Dolichophis
 Caspian whipsnake (Dolichophis caspius)
 Black whipsnake (Dolichophis jugularis)
 Red-bellied racer (Dolichophis schmidti)
 Genus: Eirenis
 Bolkar dwarf snake (Eirenis aurolineatus)
 Baran's dwarf racer (Eirenis barani)
 Collared dwarf racer (Eirenis collaris)
 Crowned dwarf snake (Eirenis coronella)
 Narrow-striped dwarf snake (Eirenis decemlineatus)
 Eiselt's dwarf racer (Eirenis eiselti)
 Hakkari dwarf snake (Eirenis hakkariensis)
 Levantine dwarf snake (Eirenis levantinus)
 Striped dwarf snake (Eirenis lineomaculatus)
 Ring-headed dwarf snake (Eirenis modestus)
 Dotted dwarf racer (Eirenis punctatolineatus)
 Roth's dwarf racer (Eirenis rothii)
 Van dwarf snake (Eirenis thospitis)
 Genus: Elaphe
 Blotched snake (Elaphe sauromates)
 Genus: Hemorrhois
 Coin-marked snake (Hemorrhois nummifer)
 Spotted whipsnake (Hemorrhois ravergieri)
 Genus: Malpolon
 Montpellier snake (Malpolon monspessulanus)
 Genus: Muhtarophis
 Baran's black-headed dwarf snake (Muhtarophis barani)
 Genus: Natrix
 Large-headed water snake (Natrix megalocephala)
 Grass snake (Natrix natrix)
 Dice snake (Natrix tessellata)
 Genus: Platyceps
 Red whipsnake (Platyceps collaris)
 Dahl's whipsnake (Platyceps najadum)
 Glossy-bellied racer (Platyceps ventromaculatus)
 Genus: Pseudocyclophis
 Dark-headed dwarf racer (Pseudocyclophis persicus)
 Genus: Rhynchocalamus
 Black-headed groundsnake (Rhynchocalamus melanocephalus)
 Genus: Spalerosophis
 Diadem snake (Spalerosophis diadema)
 Genus: Telescopus
 European catsnake (Telescopus fallax)
 Black catsnake (Telescopus nigriceps)
 Genus: Zamenis
 Transcaucasian ratsnake (Zamenis hohenackeri)
 Aesculapian snake (Zamenis longissimus)
 European ratsnake (Zamenis situla)
 Family: Elapidae
 Genus: Walterinnesia
 Eastern desert black snake (Walterinnesia morgani)
 Family: Viperidae
 Genus: Macrovipera
 Blunt-nosed viper (Macrovipera lebetinus)
 Genus: Montivipera
 Central Turkish mountain viper (Montivipera albizona)
 Armenian viper (Montivipera raddei)
 Ocellated mountain viper (Montivipera wagneri)
 Ottoman viper (Montivipera xanthina)
 Genus: Pseudocerastes
 Persian horned viper (Pseudocerastes persicus)
 Genus: Vipera
 Long-nosed viper (Vipera ammodytes)
 Baran's adder (Vipera barani)
 Common European adder (Vipera berus)
 Darevsky's viper (Vipera darevskii)
 Armenian steppe viper (Vipera eriwanensis)
 Caucasus viper (Vipera kaznakovi)
 Pontic adder (Vipera pontica)
 Transcaucasian sand viper (Vipera transcaucasiana)
 Meadow viper (Vipera ursinii)

Order: Testudines (turtles and tortoises)

Suborder: Cryptodira
 Family: Dermochelyidae
 Genus: Dermochelys
 Leatherback sea turtle (Dermochelys coriacea)
 Family: Cheloniidae
 Genus: Caretta
 Loggerhead sea turtle (Caretta caretta)
 Genus: Chelonia
 Green sea turtle (Chelonia mydas)
 Family: Emydidae
 Genus: Emys
 European pond turtle (Emys orbicularis)
 Family: Geoemydidae
 Genus: Mauremys
 Caspian turtle (Mauremys caspica)
 Balkan pond turtle (Mauremys rivulata)
 Family: Trionychidae
 Genus: Rafetus
 Euphrates softshell turtle (Rafetus euphraticus)
 Genus: Trionyx
 African softshell turtle (Trionyx triunguis)
 Family: Testudinidae
 Genus: Testudo
 Spur-thighed tortoise (Testudo graeca)
 Hermann's tortoise (Testudo hermanni)
 Marginated tortoise (Testudo marginata)

See also
Wildlife of Turkey
List of mammals of Turkey
List of birds of Turkey
List of moths of Turkey

References 

Turkey
Turkey
Reptiles
Turkey
 List